The Tiger Falls are hidden in the hilly terrains of Chakrata in Uttarakhand, India. It is 98 km from the state capital, Dehradun, 20 km from Chakrata and can be reached by a 5 km trek with rhododendron and oak trees surroundings. At an elevation of 312 ft, it is considered the highest direct waterfall in India.

See also
List of waterfalls of India

References

External links

Landforms of Uttarakhand
Tourist attractions in Uttarakhand
Waterfalls of Uttarakhand